Ceromitia autoscia is a moth of the  family Adelidae. It is found in Victoria.

External links
Australian Faunal Directory

Moths of Australia
Adelidae
Endemic fauna of Australia
Moths described in 1906